Stanisław Zaremba (date of birth unknown – d. 1648) was a Polish writer, Cistercian, abbot of Sulejów. Since 1645, Roman Catholic bishop of Kyiv.

In his work Okulary na rozchody w Koronie i z Korony... ("A Look at Expenditure in the Crown and from the Crown") published in 1623 he recommended development of craft and trade, and material export limitation.

Works

References

1648 deaths
Palacký University Olomouc alumni
Abbots of Sulejów
Roman Catholic bishops of Kyiv
17th-century Roman Catholic bishops in the Polish–Lithuanian Commonwealth
Cistercian bishops
Polish male writers
Military personnel of the Polish–Lithuanian Commonwealth
Year of birth unknown
Ecclesiastical senators of the Polish–Lithuanian Commonwealth
Polish Cistercians